Pirhəsənli (also, Pirgasanli and Pirgasanly) is a village and municipality in the Agsu Rayon of Azerbaijan.  It has a population of 1,496.

References 

Populated places in Agsu District